Aïcha Chaibi was a Tunisian novelist. Not much is known about Chaibi's life. In 1975 she published Rached which promoted Tunisian cultural identity while criticizing European values.

Works 
 (1975) Rached (also sometimes titled as Rachid), published by Maison Tunisienne de l'Édition

References 

Tunisian novelists
20th-century Tunisian women writers
20th-century Tunisian writers
Tunisian writers in French